Christophe Annedouche (28 June 1803 – 10 June 1866) was a French engraver from Paris. He is known for his natural history illustrations in works such as Georges Cuvier's Le Règne Animal.

Biography 

On March 29, 1832, Annedouche married Marie Louise Sebin. They had three children, Emile Alexandre, Joseph Alfred and Jules André, and lived in Paris. Joseph Alfred was like his father a well-known engraver and artist. When he exhibited at the Royal Museum in 1845, he was living at Rue St-Jacques.

He engraved some plates on behalf of Jean-Gabriel Prêtre for the 1821 Faune française, ou Histoire naturelle, générale et particulière des animaux qui se trouvent en France, and some for later editions of Georges Cuvier's Le Règne Animal. In Exploration scientifique de l'Algérie pendant les années 1840, 1841, 1842 he engraved plates including one of an Arabian bustard, painted by A.J.B. Vaillant.

In the Magasin de zoologie he engraved works by artists including Léon Daniel de Joannis, Prêtre, Louis Victor Bevalet and Émile Théophile Blanchard.

Works

Sources

References

External links 

French illustrators
1803 births
1866 deaths
Engravers from Paris